Daedalus Entertainment was a Canadian game company that produced role-playing games and game supplements.

History
Daedalus Games began when Robin Laws approached Jose Garcia in 1993 with an idea for a Hong Kong Action Cinema RPG; Garcia liked the idea, but the RPG Nexus: The Infinite City was his first priority, and was published in 1994 with Garcia as the main designer and developer, with Laws, Bruce Baugh, and Rob Heinsoo as additional authors. Daedalus Games was incorporated as Daedalus Entertainment in preparation for publishing the Hong Kong action game Laws had intended, but Garcia liked the setting that Laws was working on and decided to use it as a basis of a collectible card game to take advantage of the CCG market and Daedalus published this game as Shadowfist (1995). Daedalus Entertainment published the role-playing game Feng Shui (1996), designed by Laws using a variant of the Nexus game system; Laws also designed supplements for Feng Shui.

When the CCG market crashed in 1997, the staff of Daedalus were laid off or quit, leaving Jose Garcia and his sister Maria as the only people working for the company. Daedalus filed for chapter 11 bankruptcy protection, and when the company sold off a few of its properties a few years later, Feng Shui went to Laws. Stephan Michael Sechi had licensed the rights to Daedalus to publish a new edition of Talislanta by Robin Laws, but Daedalus faltered before its version saw print.

References

Role-playing game publishing companies